Downtown Historic District may refer to:

 Downtown Historic District (San Jose, California), listed on the NRHP in Santa Clara County, California
 Downtown Historic District (Washington, D.C.), listed on the NRHP in Washington, D.C.
 Downtown Historic District (Lafayette, Indiana), listed on the NRHP in Indiana
 Downtown Historic District (Galesville, Wisconsin), listed on the NRHP in Wisconsin
 Downtown Historic District (Sheboygan Falls, Wisconsin), listed on the NRHP in Wisconsin
 Downtown Historic District (Waukesha, Wisconsin), listed on the NRHP in Wisconsin
 Burlington Downtown Historic District, listed on the NRHP in Wisconsin
 Cedar Falls Downtown Historic District, listed on the NRHP in Iowa
 Clinton Historic District (disambiguation), several districts
 Dallas Downtown Historic District, listed on the NRHP in Texas
 Hudson Downtown Historic District, listed on the NRHP in Michigan
 Olympia Downtown Historic District, listed on the NRHP in Washington
 Provo Downtown Historic District, listed on the NRHP in Utah
 Salem Historic District (disambiguation), several districts

See also
 Downtown Commercial Historic District (disambiguation)